Events from the year 1981 in China.

Incumbents 
 Chairman of the Chinese Communist Party – Hua Guofeng / Hu Yaobang
 Chairman of the Congress – Ye Jianying (head of state)
 Premier – Zhao Ziyang 
 Chairman of the Chinese People's Political Consultative Conference – Deng Xiaoping
 Vice Premier of the People's Republic of China – Wan Li

Governors  
 Governor of Anhui Province – Zhang Jingfu then Zhou Zijian 
 Governor of Fujian Province – Ma Xingyuan 
 Governor of Gansu Province – Feng Jixin then Li Dengying 
 Governor of Guangdong Province – Xi Zhongxun then Liu Tianfu 
 Governor of Guizhou Province – Su Gang 
 Governor of Hebei Province – Li Erzhong 
 Governor of Heilongjiang Province – Chen Lei 
 Governor of Henan Province – Liu Jie then Dai Suli  
 Governor of Hubei Province – Han Ningfu 
 Governor of Hunan Province – Sun Guozhi 
 Governor of Jiangsu Province – Hui Yuyu
 Governor of Jiangxi Province – Bai Dongcai
 Governor of Jilin Province – Yu Ke 
 Governor of Liaoning Province – Chen Puru 
 Governor of Qinghai Province – Zhang Guosheng 
 Governor of Shaanxi Province – Yu Mingtao 
 Governor of Shandong Province – Su Yiran 
 Governor of Shanxi Province – Luo Guibo 
 Governor of Sichuan Province – Lu Dadong
 Governor of Yunnan Province – Liu Minghui 
 Governor of Zhejiang Province – Li Fengping

Events 

1981 was the year of the rooster in the Chinese Zodiac. 
China was sad at that time. 

 January 24 - Dawu earthquake
 May 22 - 1st Golden Rooster Awards
 July 9 - Chengdu-Kunming rail crash
 July 22 - Yangquan theatre bombing
 Unknown date – TTK Home Appliance, as predecessor of TCL Technology was founded in Guangdong Province.

Establishments 

 National Population and Family Planning Commission
 Beijing Marathon
 Capital Museum
 China Daily
 Chongqing Broadcasting Group
 Jinling Hotel
 Golden Rooster Awards
 Flying Apsaras Awards
 Duzhe
 TCL Corporation
 Soong Ching-ling Memorial Residence (Shanghai)
 Shantou Special Economic Zone

Births 

 January 2 - Zhang Juanjuan, archer
 January 18 - Song Lun, figure skater
 February 3 - Huang Zhiyi, footballer
 April 4 - Zhang Lei, racing cyclist
 April 6 - Wang Di, football referee
 April 19 - Zhang Yalin, footballer (d. 2010)
 August 29 - Zeng Shaoxuan, tennis player
 September 23 - Zhang Ai, softball player
 Liu Jiayin, independent filmmaker

Deaths 

 Zhang Dingcheng
 Hu Lancheng, died in Japan
 Du Yuming
 Liu Yuzhang, died in Taiwan
 Wang Shujin, died in Taiwan
 Lü Wencheng
 Jiang Yukun

See also 
 1981 in Chinese film

References